Cryptoporidae is a family of brachiopods belonging to the order Rhynchonellida.

Genera:
 Aulites Richardson, 1987
 Cryptopora Jeffreys, 1869
 †Cryptoporella Bitner & Pisera, 1979

References

Brachiopods